Pfaffenberg may refer to:

 Pfaffenberg (Hohenstein-Ernstthal), a mountain in Germany
 Pfaffenberg (Spessart), a hill in Germany
 Pfaffenberg (Wendelsheim), a mountain in Germany